The British Indian Ocean Territory (BIOT) is an archipelago of 55 islands in the Indian Ocean, located south of India. It is situated approximately halfway between Africa and Indonesia. The islands form a semicircular group with an open sea towards the east. The largest, Diego Garcia, is located at the southern extreme end. It measures  and accounts for almost three-quarters of the total land area of the territory. Diego Garcia is the only inhabited island and is home to the joint UK-US naval support facility. Other islands within the archipelago include Danger Island, Three Brothers Islands, Nelson Island, and Peros Banhos, as well as the island groups of the Egmont Islands, Eagle Islands, and the Salomon Islands.

Physical geography
BIOT is an archipelago of 55 islands. They were annexed by the UK in 1965 under the Treaty of Paris from a much larger archipelago which in 1804 consisted of 2,300 independent islands. BIOT is situated in the Indian Ocean near the Equator. The Chagos Islands archipelago are northeast of Mauritius, while Agalega Islands are due north. The islands are characterised as coral atolls whose formation occurred at the summits of volcanic mountains these being submerged.

The climate is tropical marine; hot, humid, and moderated by trade winds. It is located outside the route of the cyclones.

Marine reserve

It is known formally as the Chagos Marine Protected Area, because it is a "pristine ocean ecosystem now representing 16% of the world's fully protected coral reef." Fishing is banned within the reserve area. Diego Garcia is a Ramsar site.

Landforms
Of the 55 islands of the Chagos Archipelago, Diego Garcia is the largest. Aside from this, the main islands are the Egmont Islands, Danger Island, Aigle (Eagle) Islands, Three Brothers, Nelson Island, Salomon Islands, and Peros Banhos at the northern end of the Chagos Archipelago.

Diego Garcia

Diego Garcia lies at the southernmost tip of the Chagos-Laccadive Ridge — a vast submarine range in the Indian Ocean. At the entrance to the lagoon, there are three small islands, and these are East Island, Middle Island, and West Island. In some areas, the atoll has both marshes and wetlands. The ecosystem consists of undisturbed tropical forests.

Peros Banhos Atoll
They consist of several groups of islets and reefs; deep channels separate them. They had a population of some 400 islanders before the evacuation in 1965, the largest number living on Île du Coin in the southwest corner of the atoll (in the previous century, the dominant island was Île Diamant in the northwest corner of the atoll); in all, there were seven inhabited islands.

Salomon Atoll

Some 25 km east of Peros Banhos Atoll, the smaller Salomon group comprises eleven islands clustered around a lagoon measuring 8 km long and 5 km wide. Prior to the removal of its population, six of the islands were inhabited with a total of about 250 islanders. Île Boddam in the southwest was the principal settlement, while Île Takamaka in the east was the centre of boatbuilding for the archipelago.

Nelson Island, Three Brother Islands and Eagle Islands
Lying between Diego Garcia in the south, and the Peros Banhos and Salomon Atolls in the north, the remaining coralline islands are scattered over a wide area of the Great Chagos Bank, an area of atolls, reefs and shoals with an average depth of water of some 20 metres. Uninhabited Île Nelson lies 35 km south of Salomon Atoll. A hundred km to the southwest of Nelson are the 3 islands of Trois Frères, which were briefly inhabited in the 19th century. Further west lies the Île d'Aigle, which was inhabited until 1935. Île Vache Marine, the southernmost of the Eagle Islands, lies south.

Danger Island
It is covered with tall coconut trees and shrubs.

Six Îles, or Egmont Atoll
Finally, Six Îles Atoll (also called Egmont),  further south of Danger, was also occupied for short periods during the mid 19th century  until 1935. Besides the six named islands, the atoll also includes a seventh unnamed island. A fringing reef circumscribes the atoll. There are two openings into the ocean. It almost encompasses a large lagoon. The islands are connected by reefs which are steep and there are no locations for anchorage on its shores.

Human geography

In the late 18th century, coconut palm plantations were established on the island to produce copra for which slave labourers were brought in from Africa. A small population lived in the archipelago, descendants of Mauritian laborers working the copra industry. After an agreement was signed in 1966 between Britain and the United States, the US built a military base and forcibly evacuated all indigenous people; 1,200 from Diego Garcia, Ile du Coin, and Île Boddam were relocated to Mauritius, while others went to the Seychelles. In 2000, the Chagos islanders won an appeal which restored their authority to live on the islands, and they received UK citizenship in the following year. A 2008 court decision blocked their return. Further complications arose after the 2010 establishment of the world's largest marine reserve as the islanders' commercial fishing capabilities, if they returned to the archipelago, would be curtailed, thus hampering their traditional livelihood.

References

Bibliography

External links

 
B
British Territory